Catherine Lord may refer to:
Catherine Lord (born 1949), American artist, writer, curator, social activist, professor, scholar
Catherine Lord (psychologist) (born 1950), American autism researcher